The Melges 15 is an American sailboat that was designed by Reichel/Pugh as a two-crew, one-design racer and sail trainer. First built in 2020, it is Reichel/Pugh's design #289.

In December 2021 the design was named Sailing World magazine's 2022 Boat of the Year.

Production
The design has been built by Melges Performance Sailboats in the United States since 2020 and remains in production. Beginning in March 2022, the boat is also being built for the European market by Nelo in Vila do Conde, Portugal.

A total of 150 boats had been delivered by October 2021.

Design
The boat's main design goals were stability and performance over a variety of conditions. The hull design employs a narrow beam and a flat cross-section shape to provide stability and improve righting moment, while making it easy to plane. It also has fore-aft hull rocker built in to allow sailing in larger waves. The design  incorporates a deep cockpit, high boom and other measures to improve crew ergonomics.

The Melges 15 is a racing sailing dinghy, with the hull built predominantly of polyester fiberglass. It has a fractional sloop rig with a retractable bowsprit and a Gnav boom vang system. The spars are aluminum. The hull has a plumb stem; a vertical transom; a transom-hung, aluminum rudder controlled by a tiller with an extension and a retractable, aluminum daggerboard. It displaces .

Removing the daggerboard allows operation in shallow water, beaching or ground transportation on a trailer.

Operational history
Sailing World magazine's 2022 Boat of the Year judges noted, "'of all the boats we sailed, it was the one I really didn't want to get off of,' Stewart says. 'For me, selecting it as our Boat of the Year comes down to execution of the build and its performance. It's exceptional in all ways. Everything is so well-integrated and clean. It starts with a good designer, and then it's good product development and craftsmanship—there's nothing on this boat that you don't need.' Powlison seconds Stewart's praise for the boat, especially the part about how it serves such a wide variety of crew combinations. 'It's not just a race boat, but a boat to go sail and have fun with anyone, anytime.'"

See also
List of sailing boat types

References

External links

Dinghies
2020s sailboat type designs
Sailing yachts
One-design sailing classes
Sailboat type designs by Reichel/Pugh
Sailboat types built by Melges Performance Sailboats
Sailboat types built by Nelo